Polydesmidae is a family of millipedes in the order Polydesmida. These millipedes range from 4 mm to 30 mm in length. This family includes species notable for featuring sexual dimorphism in segment number: Adult females in the genus Perapolydesmus have the usual 20 segments (counting the collum as the first segment and the telson as the last), but the adult males have only 19.

Genera

Antrochodus
Archipolydesmus 
Basicentrus 
Bhutanodesmus 
Bidentogon 
Bosniodesmus 
Bosporodesmus 
Brachydesmus 
Brembosoma 
Calianotus 
Chromobrachydesmus 
Cookia
Cretodesmus 
Dixidesmus 
Epanerchodus 
Eumastigonodesmus 
Goniodesmus 
Haplobrachidesmus 
Haplocookia 
Heterocookia 
Himalodesmus 
Hispaniodesmus 
Huzichodus 
Jaxartes
Kirgisdesmus 
Leptobrachydesmus 
Lophobrachydesmus 
Mastigonodesmus 
Mastuchus 
Merioceratium 
Niponchodus 
Nipponesmus 
Nomarchus 
Pacidesmus 
Peltogonopus 
Perapolydesmus 
Polydesmus 
Prionomatis 
Propolydesmus 
Pseudopolydesmus 
Retrorsia 
Riuerchodus 
Sardodesmus 
Schedoleiodesmus 
Schizobrachydesmus 
Schizomeritius 
Schizoturanius 
Scytonotus 
Serradium 
Spanobrachium 
Speodesmus 
Stylobrachydesmus 
Telopoditius 
Tolosanius 
Trachynotus 
Troglobrachydesmus 
Turanodesmus 
Uniramidesmus 
Usbekodesmus 
Utadesmus

References

Polydesmida
Millipede families